Rock the Bells was an annual hip-hop festival that originally took place in Southern California only, but has since toured throughout the world. The concert featured a line-up of high-profile alternative hip-hop artists, often headlined by a more mainstream artist. The first festival was held in 2004, featuring a re-united Wu-Tang Clan, who performed four months before Ol' Dirty Bastard's death. That festival is covered in depth by a documentary film also called Rock the Bells.

Festivals

Club Tour
The concept was taken from the original, highly successful annual West-Coast hip-hop festival and transformed into a full-fledged United States tour.

2007 Festival Series

Rock the Bells 2007 had 3 major venues scheduled; July 28 and July 29 in New York, August 11 in San Bernardino, and August 18 in San Francisco. These select shows were headlined by a reunited Rage Against the Machine, and co-headlined by Wu-Tang Clan. The artists appearing in the shows appeared in rotating slots over the two-show weekend in New York, and selected performances for the remaining duration of the 20 shows, which were head-lined by the Wu-Tang Clan. Five cities also had a second stage called the Paid Dues Independent Hip Hop Stage. Rage Against the Machine was the festival's first non-hip hop act to be featured.

New York City Dates
In July 2007, the Rock the Bells festival came to New York City, and this event became particularly noteworthy. Upon selling out the massive Randall's Island venue very quickly, the one-day stop in NYC was expanded to two days, and a number of new and exclusive guests were added to the bills. The festival included the full Paid Dues festival lineup performing on a second stage, reunited headliners Rage Against the Machine and Wu-Tang Clan, guest appearances during the show (including Scott Ian performing Bring the Noise with Public Enemy), a special performance of Black Star from Mos Def and Talib Kweli and one of the near-final performances of noted hip-hop luminary Pimp C.

2008 Festival Series

2008 also marks the first year that Rock the Bells went global with four stops in Europe and one in Japan. Highlights of the series include a first time date in Toronto, plus a return to the Glen Helen Pavilion in San Bernardino where last year's show sold out with a capacity crowd of 45,000 people.

2008 International Festival Series

2009 International Festival Series

2010 Festival Series
On the evening of May 24, 2010 Guerilla Union held the Rock the Bells Launch Party at Key Club in Hollywood, CA. The launch party featured surprise guest performances, and the official announcement of the 2010 season lineup. New to the festival this year is a "Classics" theme; the headlining acts will be performing the following classic hip-hop albums in their entirety: A Tribe Called Quest performing Midnight Marauders, Snoop Dogg (with Warren G, Tha Dogg Pound, The Lady of Rage and RBX) performing Doggystyle, Wu-Tang Clan (entire group, with Boy Jones – first son of Ol' Dirty Bastard) performing Enter the Wu-Tang (36 Chambers), Rakim performing Paid in Full, KRS-One performing Criminal Minded, Slick Rick performing The Great Adventures of Slick Rick, and DJ Premier and Lauryn Hill as special guests. Unannounced guest appearances included The Madd Rapper, Large Professor, Busta Rhymes, Skyzoo, Swizz Beatz, and Nas.

2011 Festival Series
On the evening of May 24, 2011 Guerilla Union once again held the Rock the Bells Launch Party. Rapper Supernatural revealed the lineup for this year's edition of the festival. Keeping in the spirit of the 2010 artists, the more prolific acts on this year's festival will be performing a selection of "classic" albums in their entirety. These include Lauryn Hill's The Miseducation of Lauryn Hill, Nas' Illmatic, Erykah Badu's Baduizm, Cypress Hill's Black Sunday, Mos Def & Talib Kweli's Black Star, Raekwon's Only Built 4 Cuban Linx..., Mobb Deep's The Infamous, Gza's Liquid Swords, Souls of Mischief's 93 'til Infinity, Black Moon's Enta da Stage and Masta Killa's No Said Date. Additionally, Currensy and Mac Miller will be appearing exclusively on the west coast dates while Evidence will appear only on the East Coast. More recently, rapper Common has been added to three shows, performing his album Be.

 *Denotes that the artist will be appearing only in select cities

2012 Festival Series
From early May to June, Guerilla Union unveiled the full lineup for the latest Rock the Bells festival series. It was also revealed that this year's festival will consist of three, two-day weekend events, with two shows on the west coast and one in the east.

2013 Festival Series
On May 14, Guerilla Union held a launch party in Los Angeles. At that event they announced performances by Black Hippy, Big K.R.I.T., Brother Ali, Chase & Status, Common, Bone Thugs-n-Harmony (including a virtual performance by the late Eazy-E), Currensy, Danny Brown, Dilated Peoples, Dizzy Wright, Dom Kennedy, E-40, Earl Sweatshirt, Hit-Boy, Hopsin, Immortal Technique, Jhené Aiko, Joey Badass and the Pro Era, Juicy J, Jurassic 5, Kid Cudi, Lecrae, Logic, Mimosa, Rakim,  Riff Raff, Snow Tha Product, Talib Kweli, Tech N9ne, Too Short, Tyler, The Creator and Wu-Tang Clan (including a virtual performance by the late Ol' Dirty Bastard). Other performers added by the start of  the festival included ASAP Mob, Girl Talk, J Cole, Jurassic 5, KRS-One, Deltron 3030, Slick Rick, Doug E. Fresh, Chief Keef, and a New York only headline performance by Pretty Lights. The 2013 series was hosted by Murs and Hot 97's Peter Rosenberg. To mark the 10th anniversary of Rock the Bells, Wu Tang Clan was meant to reunite, but Raekwon and Ghostface Killah did not make appearances. Originally the series was scheduled for eight dates, two nights each in San Francisco, Los Angeles, Washington D.C., and New York City. However, due to poor sales, the east coast shows were canceled.

See also

List of hip hop music festivals
List of electronic music festivals

References 

^ Tickets and Lineups The Boston show originally scheduled for September 10 was postponed until September 24 before being officially cancelled. Problems cited include: weather and scheduling conflicts.

External links
Rock The Bells – Official Website
Guerilla Union – Official Website
Paid Dues – Official Website
– Live photos from the 2009 Stop in Toronto
[VIDEO] Rock The Bells 2010 – Hip Hop Quotables
Exclusive Footage of the Tour – Official Website
Rock The Bells – Official Website for the film covering the 2004 festival
Rock the Bells 2010 Announcement
[PHOTOS] Rock The Bells 2011

Music festivals in California
Music festivals established in 2004
Concert tours
Hip hop music festivals in the United States
Electronic music festivals in the United States